Edwin Moore may refer to:

 Edwin Hardwick Moore (1910–2004), British businessman
 Edwin L. Moore (1916–2009), researcher for the United States Department of Agriculture
 Edwin Ward Moore (1810–1865), United States Navy officer
 C. Edwin Moore, American judge in Iowa